The 1972 UEFA Cup Final was the final of the first UEFA Cup football tournament. It was a two-legged contest played on 3 May and 17 May 1972 between two English clubs, Wolverhampton Wanderers and Tottenham Hotspur. This was the first UEFA club competition final to feature two teams from the same association.

Tottenham Hotspur won the tie 3–2 on aggregate. A 2–1 victory away from home in the first leg proved decisive for them, with Martin Chivers scoring a remarkable late winner, firing in an unstoppable shot from 25 yards. They then held Wolves to a 1–1 draw in the second leg to win the competition.

Road to the final

Note: In all results below, the score of the finalist is given first (H: home; A: away).

Match details

First leg

Second leg

See also
1921 FA Cup Final
1971–72 UEFA Cup
1972 European Cup Final
1972 European Cup Winners' Cup Final
English football clubs in international competitions
Tottenham Hotspur F.C. in European football

References

External links
RSSSF

2
1972
UEFA Cup Final 1972
UEFA Cup Final 1972
1972
UEFA
UEFA Cup Final
UEFA Cup Final
UEFA Cup Final 1972